Fadi Mahmoud Awad Saleh is a Jordanian footballer who plays for Al-Wehdat and the Jordan national football team. In June 2022, He joined Malaysian Premier League team PDRM during the second window transfer.

International career
Awad played his first international match against Thailand in the 2016 King's Cup in Bangkok on 5 June 2016, which Jordan lost 2–0.

International goals

With U-19

None-International goals

International career statistics

References

External links 

Living people
Jordanian footballers
Jordan international footballers
Jordan youth international footballers
Association football midfielders
1993 births
Jordanian people of Palestinian descent
Footballers at the 2014 Asian Games
People from Irbid
Al-Wehdat SC players
Mansheyat Bani Hasan players
Al-Sheikh Hussein FC players
Al-Jalil players
Jordanian expatriate footballers
Expatriate footballers in Kuwait
Jordanian expatriate sportspeople in Kuwait
Al Tadhamon SC players
Asian Games competitors for Jordan
Kuwait Premier League players
Jordanian Pro League players